Saint-Nicolas-Saint-Romain is a former railway station in Saint-Nicolas-de-la-Balerme, Nouvelle-Aquitaine, France. The station is located on the Bordeaux–Sète railway. The station was served by TER (local) services operated by SNCF. It was closed for passenger traffic in 2011.

References

Defunct railway stations in Lot-et-Garonne